Xinca (or Xinka, Szinca) is a small extinct family of Mesoamerican languages, formerly regarded as a single language isolate, once spoken by the indigenous Xinca people in southeastern Guatemala, much of El Salvador, and parts of Honduras.

Classification
The Xincan languages have no demonstrated affiliations with other language families. Lehmann (1920) tried linking Xincan with Lencan, but the proposal was never demonstrated. An automated computational analysis (ASJP 4) by Müller et al. (2013) also found lexical similarities between Xincan and Lencan. However, since the analysis was automatically generated, the grouping could be either due to mutual lexical borrowing or genetic inheritance.

The Xincan languages were formerly regarded as one language isolate, but the most recent studies suggest they were indeed a language family.

Languages
There were at least four Xincan languages, each of which is now extinct. Yupiltepeque was spoken in Jutiapa Department, while the rest are spoken in Santa Rosa Department. Campbell also suggests that the Alagüilac language of San Cristóbal Acasaguastlán may have in fact been a Xincan language.

Yupiltepeque: extinct by 1920. Once also spoken in Jutiapa.
Jumaytepeque: discovered in the early 1970s by Lyle Campbell, spoken near the top of Volcán Jumaytepeque. This is the most divergent variety, and is not mutually intelligible with that of Chiquimulilla. All fluent native speakers of the language have died, but it may have some semi-speakers remaining.
Chiquimulilla: extinct
Guazacapán: extinct, some semi-speakers remain.

To these, Glottolog adds
Sinacantán

Sachse (2010) considers all Xincan speakers today to be semi-speakers, with the completely fluent speakers having already died.

History
Xincan languages have many loanwords from Mayan languages especially in agricultural terms, suggesting extensive contact with Mayan peoples.

In the 16th century the territory of the Xinca extended from the Pacific coast to the mountains of Jalapa. In 1524 the population was conquered by the Spanish Empire. Many of the people were forced into slavery and compelled to participate in the conquest of modern-day El Salvador. It is from this that the names for the town, river, and bridge "Los Esclavos" (The Slaves) are derived in the area of Cuilapa, Santa Rosa.
 
After 1575, the process of Xinca cultural extinction accelerated, mainly due to their exportation to other regions. This also contributed to a decrease in the number of Xinca-language speakers. One of the oldest references concerning this language was presented by the archbishop Pedro Cortés y Larraz during a visit to the diocese of Taxisco in 1769.

Contemporary situation
Xinca was most recently spoken in seven municipalities and a village in the departments of Santa Rosa and Jutiapa. In 1991, it was reported that the language had only 25 speakers, and the 2006 edition of the Encyclopedia of Language and Linguistics reported fewer than ten. Nonetheless, of the 16,214 Xinca who responded to the 2002 census, 1,283 reported being Xinka speakers, most probably semi-speakers or people who knew a few words and phrases of the languages. However by 2010, all completely fluent speakers have died, leaving only semi-speakers who know the languages.

Distribution
Xincan languages were once more widespread, which is evident in various toponyms with Xincan origins (Campbell 1997:166). These toponyms are marked by such locative prefixes as ay- "place of" (e.g. Ayampuc, Ayarza), al- "place of" (Alzatate), san- "in" (e.g. Sansare, Sansur), or with the locative suffixes -(a)gua or -hua "town, dwelling" (e.g. Pasasagua, Jagua, Anchagua, Xagua, Eraxagua).

Kaufman (1970:66) lists the following towns as once being Xinca-speaking.

Yupiltepeque
Jumaytepeque (Nueva Santa Rosa)
San Juan Tecuaco
Chiquimulilla
Taxisco
Santa María Ixhuatán
Guazacapán

Sachse (2010), citing colonial-era sources, lists the following villages in Santa Rosa Department and Jutiapa Department as having Xinca speakers during the Spanish colonial era.

Guanagazapa (Guanagazapan), in Escuintla Department
Guaymango
Itiquipaque (also known as Atiquipaque or Nextiquipaque)
Tepeaco
Tacuilula
Taxisco
Guazacapán
Chiquimulilla
Sinacantán
Nancinta
Tecuaco
Ixhuatán (Izguatlán)

Jumaytepéque
Jalpatagua
Jutiapa
Comapa
Yupiltepeque
Atescatempa
La Zacualpa
Contepeque
Achuapa
Valle Tierra Blanca (parish of Tacuilula)
Santa Ana (parish of Xinacantán)
San Juan Mixtán (a trilingual village where Spanish, Nahuatl, and Xinca were spoken)

Phonology 
The phonological system of Xincan languages had some variance, as evidenced by the variations in recorded phonology exhibited among semi-speakers of the two remaining languages.

Vowels 
It is generally agreed upon that the Xincan languages have 6 vowels.

Consonants 
The number and type of consonants in the Xincan languages is not known. This chart shows the consonants used by the final semi-speakers of the language.

Many younger semi-speakers also used the phonemes /b, d, g, f, ŋ, ʂ/ due to greater influence from Spanish.

See also

Alagüilac language
Macro-Chibchan languages
Classification of indigenous languages of the Americas

References

 Campbell, Lyle (1997). American Indian languages: The historical linguistics of Native America. New York: Oxford University Press. .
 Sachse, Frauke (2010). Reconstructive description of eighteenth-century Xinka grammar. Utrecht: Netherlands Graduate School of Linguistics. .
 Rogers, Chris Rogers. (2016) The Use and Development of the Xinkan Languages. University of Texas Press

This article draws heavily upon the corresponding article in the Spanish-language Wikipedia which was accessed in the version of 29 November 2005.

 
Language families
Indigenous languages of Central America
Languages of Guatemala
Jutiapa Department
Santa Rosa Department, Guatemala
Languages of El Salvador
Mesoamerican languages
Endangered unclassified languages
Macro-Chibchan languages